HMS Tongham was one of 93 ships of the  of inshore minesweepers.

Their names were all chosen from villages ending in -ham. The minesweeper was named after Tongham in Surrey. Dry stored ashore at the Gareloch base, and on release used by the RNXS, based at Greenock.

References
Blackman, R.V.B. ed. Jane's Fighting Ships (1953)

 

Tongham is now for sale at Foundry Reach Yacht Sales and Services, please view her spec from the link that follows:
http://www.foundryreach.co.uk/viewvessel.asp?id=109

Ham-class minesweepers
Royal Navy ship names
1955 ships